Rhyncholaelia digbyana is a species of orchid occurring from Honduras to Belize, Guatemala, Mexico and Costa Rica.

Rl. digbyana can be distinguished from the other species of Rhyncholaelia (Rl. glauca) by the frilled labellum.

The orchid has been discovered by José Antonio Molina Rosito, a Honduran|Catracho botanist and Professor emeritus at the Zamorano Pan-American School of Agriculture.

Rhyncholaelia digbyana was declared the national flower of Honduras (Flor Nacional de Honduras) on 1969 November 26.

References 

 Rhyncholaelia digbyana at the Internet Orchid Species Photo Encyclopedia

External links 

digbyana
Orchids of Central America
Orchids of Belize
Orchids of Costa Rica
Orchids of Guatemala
Orchids of Honduras
Orchids of Mexico